Khalid Abdul Hamid Ansari is an Indian businessman and journalist. He is the Chairman of the Mid-Day Group of publications based in Mumbai, and of Inquilab Publications Ltd. He is the son of Abdul Hamid Ansari, independence activist and Congressman, who founded The Inquilab Publications Ltd in 1938 during the freedom movement. He was awarded the Padma Shri in 2001. He has also written a number of books on cricket.

Bibliography
 Sachin: Born to Bat - 2012.
 Cricket at fever pitch - 2015.

References

Ansari, Khalid A H
Businesspeople from Mumbai
Recipients of the Padma Shri in literature & education
Indian sports journalists
Indian newspaper editors
Indian sportswriters
20th-century Indian Muslims
20th-century Indian journalists
Indian male journalists
Journalists from Maharashtra
Year of birth missing (living people)